Elections for the Eastwood District Council took place on Thursday 5 May 1988, alongside elections to the councils of Scotland's various other districts.

The Conservatives continued their dominance of the council, winning 49% of the vote and two thirds of the Districts seats.

Aggregate results

References

1988 Scottish local elections
1988